Blackridge or Black Ridge may refer to:
 Blackridge, West Lothian, Scotland
 Blackridge railway station
 Blackridge, Pennsylvania, U.S.
 Blackridge railway station, Queensland
 Blackridge Wilderness, Utah, U.S.
 Black Ridge (Antarctica)
 Black Ridge Canyons Wilderness, Colorado and Utah, U.S.
 Schwarzenegger, a German surname, counterpart to english "Blackridge"